Datta is a village and union council (an administrative subdivision) of Mansehra District in the Khyber-Pakhtunkhwa province of Pakistan. It is surrounded by Haryala village from north west, Khushala village from north, Chikia and pengal village from west and lodia abad tandan village from south.  It is in Mansehra Tehsil.

Asad Ali Shah is the councillor most of the development in Datta is due to him.

References

Union councils of Mansehra District
Populated places in Mansehra District

The Union Council Datta consists of five (2) villages:
1- Datta
2- Haryala